Morgan Scroggy (born August 2, 1988) is an American competition swimmer.

Career

At the 2010 U.S. National Championships, the selection meet for both the 2010 Pan Pacific Swimming Championships and the 2011 World Aquatics Championships, Scroggy placed third in both the 200 m individual medley and 200 m backstroke, and fourth in the 200 m freestyle, earning a place on the US National Team roster.  At the 2010 Pan Pacific Championships, she earned the silver medal in the 200 m freestyle despite having placed just fourth in the event at Nationals.  Scroggy also swam the second leg of the 4 × 200 m freestyle relay, in which the US won the gold medal in a new championship record time of 7:51.21.

Scroggy was an engineering student at the University of Georgia, and trained under UGA coach Jack Bauerle.

Personal bests

References

External links
 
 
 Morgan Scroggy – University of Georgia athlete profile at GeorgiaDogs.com

1988 births
Living people
American female freestyle swimmers
Georgia Bulldogs women's swimmers
Universiade medalists in swimming
Universiade gold medalists for the United States
Swimmers from Portland, Oregon
Medalists at the 2009 Summer Universiade